The ARIA Singles Chart ranks the best-performing singles in Australia. Its data, published by the Australian Recording Industry Association, is based collectively on each single's weekly physical and digital sales. In 2010, 17 singles claimed the top spot. Nine acts achieved their first number-one single in Australia, either as a lead or featured artist: Owl City, Iyaz, Jason Derulo, Train, Kevin Rudolf, will.i.am, Taio Cruz, Bruno Mars and Eve. Five collaborations topped the chart. Rihanna earned three number-one singles during the year for "Rude Boy", "Only Girl (In the World)" and "Love the Way You Lie". Mars earned two number-one singles for "Just the Way You Are" and "Grenade".

Usher's "OMG" and Eminem's "Love the Way You Lie" were the longest-running number-one singles of 2010, having each topped the ARIA Singles Chart for six consecutive weeks. Owl City's "Fireflies" topped the chart for five consecutive weeks, while Train's "Hey, Soul Sister", Katy Perry's "California Gurls", Cruz's "Dynamite", and Rihanna's "Only Girl (In the World)" each spent four weeks at the number-one spot.

Chart history

Number-one artists

See also
2010 in music
List of number-one albums of 2010 (Australia)
List of top 25 singles for 2010 in Australia
List of top 10 singles in 2010 (Australia)

References

Number-one singles
Australia Singles
2010